The  is the 35th edition of the Japan Academy Film Prize, an award presented by the Nippon Academy-Sho Association to award excellence in filmmaking. It awarded the best films of 2011 and it took place on March 2, 2012, at the Grand Prince Hotel New Takanawa in Tokyo, Japan.

Nominees

Awards

References

External links 
35th Japan Academy Film Prize official website - 

Japan Academy Film Prize
2012 in Japanese cinema
Japan Academy Film Prize
March 2012 events in Japan